Amelia Louise Warren Tyagi (born September 2, 1971) is an American businesswoman, management consultant, and author. She co-founded and is president of the placement firm Business Talent Group, is a trustee emeritus of progressive think tank Demos, and co-founded HealthAllies (now part of UnitedHealth Group). She co-authored two books, The Two-Income Trap and All Your Worth, with her mother Elizabeth Warren. She is a board member for the non-profit organization Fuse Corps and a former commentator for the radio show Marketplace.

Early life and education 
Tyagi is one of two children of Elizabeth Warren and her first husband, Jim Warren. Her stepfather, Bruce H. Mann, is a legal scholar. Tyagi earned a Bachelor of Arts degree from Brown University and a Master of Business Administration from the Wharton School of the University of Pennsylvania.

Career
Tyagi worked for consulting company McKinsey & Company before becoming the current president of the Business Talent Group (BTG), which she co-founded in 2007 with Jody Greenstone Miller, BTG's current Chairman of the Board of Directors. BTG works with "40% of Fortune 100 companies" to provide independently contracted talent for business projects.

Personal life
She is married to Sushil Tyagi, a film producer and entrepreneur with whom she has three children. She appeared on Dr. Phil with her mother to promote a book they wrote together. The Cut has called Tyagi her mother's "side kick."

References

1971 births
21st-century American women writers
American management consultants
American women in business
Brown University alumni
Elizabeth Warren
Living people
Wharton School of the University of Pennsylvania alumni
Writers from Newark, New Jersey
21st-century American businesspeople